The Lamentation over the Dead Christ is a painting by the Flemish painter Anthony van Dyck, created c. 1629. It is now in the Royal Museum of Fine Arts Antwerp.

References

1629 paintings
Religious paintings by Anthony van Dyck
Paintings in the collection of the Royal Museum of Fine Arts Antwerp
Paintings of the Virgin Mary
Paintings depicting Mary Magdalene
van Dyck